Zrilić is a Croatian surname.

It is the third most common surname in the Zadar County of Croatia.

It may refer to:

 Mladen Zrilic, Serbian volleyball player

References

Croatian surnames